Abimukeswarar Temple is a Hindu temple dedicated to Shiva located in Kumbakonam in Thanjavur district, Tamil Nadu, India. The temple is one of 12 Shiva temples connected with the Mahamaham festival, which takes place in Kumbakonam every 12 years.

Location
This temple is located on the eastern bank of the Mahamaham tank, Kumbakonam. The temple is 500–1000 years old.

Presiding deity
The moolavar presiding deity, is found in his manifestation as Abimukeswarar. Shiva turned around, while nava kanniyar river goddess came there, enabling them to give darshan to them, so he is known as Abimukeswarar. His consort, Parvati, is known as Amirthavalli. The sacred tree of this temple is Gooseberry.

Sani Bhagwan of this temple is taller than the other 8 planets in the Navagraga shrine.

Mahamaham festival 
The temple is one of 12 Shiva temples connected with the Mahamaham festival, which happens every 12 years in Kumbakonam. The other temples are Kasi Viswanathar Temple, Kumbeswarar Temple, Nageswara Temple, Someswarar Temple, Kottaiyur Kodeeswarar temple, Kalahasteeswarar Temple, Gowthameswarar Temple, Amirthakalasanathar Temple, Banapuriswarar Temple, Kambatta Visvanathar Temple and Ekambareswarar Temple.

Mahasamprokshanam
The Mahasamprokshanam (also known as Kumbabishegam) of the temple was held on 26 October 2015.

Mahasamprokshanam, 26 October 2015

See also
 Hindu temples of Kumbakonam
 Mahamaham

References 

Hindu temples in Kumbakonam
Shiva temples in Thanjavur district